Metatarsal veins may refer to:

 Dorsal metatarsal veins
 Plantar metatarsal veins